is a Japanese actor who is affiliated with Izawa Office. He played the role of Yakumo "Cloud" Kato (Aoninger) in the 2015 Super Sentai TV series Shuriken Sentai Ninninger.

Biography
Matsumoto's family ran an Italian restaurant. His hobbies were watching films and playing soccer. At Toyama Daichikotōgakko high school,  he was a member of the soccer team that took part in the All Japan High School Soccer Tournament. He was a Senshu University Faculty of Economics student, but left in April 2015. In June 2013, Matsumoto became affiliated to Izawa Office. On February 22, 2015, he appeared in the 39th Super Sentai series, Shuriken Sentai Ninninger as Yakumo "Cloud" Kato/Aoninger. He was the first Heisei-born Sentai ranger since Kaizoku Sentai Gokaiger four years previously.

Filmography

TV series

Films

References

External links
 Official profile at Izawa Office  

21st-century Japanese male actors
1993 births
Living people
People from Toyama (city)
People from Toyama Prefecture